Eatonina fulgida is a species of minute sea snail, a marine gastropod mollusk in the family Cingulopsidae.

Distribution
Ireland

Description

References

Cingulopsidae
Gastropods described in 1797